Dithella is a genus of pseudoscorpions in the family Tridenchthoniidae. There are at least two described species in Dithella.

Species
These two species belong to the genus Dithella:
 Dithella javana (Tullgren, 1912)
 Dithella philippinica Beier, 1967

References

Further reading

External links

 

Tridenchthoniidae
Pseudoscorpion genera